Zallim Tera Jawab Nahin is a 1960 Hindi-language drama and romance film starring Agha, Saroj Khan and Chitra. It is directed by Ramanlal Desai, and produced by G. C. Trivedo for R. D. Productions.

Cast
 Azad
 Chitra
 Agha
 Saroj Khan
 Vasantrao Pahelwan
 Ramial
 Shyam Lal

Music
"Sunoji Mohe Dar Lage" – Sudha Malhotra
"Gora Na Pade" – Sudha Malhotra, S. D. Batish
"Jab Usko Dekha" – Sudha Malhotra
"Aaj Mere Yaar Ki Tedhi" 
"Apne Mann Ka Raju Hu Mai"
"Malik Tere Bando Ne Kya" – S. D. Batish
"Mere Dildar Vai Vai"

The musical director is S. D. Batish. The lyricists are Shadab, Farid Tonki, and Aziz Siddiqui.

References

External links

1960s Hindi-language films
1960 films
Films scored by S. D. Batish